The Claude Hayes Miller House is a house in southeast Portland, Oregon, that is listed on the National Register of Historic Places.

Further reading

See also
 National Register of Historic Places listings in Southeast Portland, Oregon

References

1923 establishments in Oregon
Bungalow architecture in Oregon
Houses completed in 1923
Houses on the National Register of Historic Places in Portland, Oregon
Southeast Portland, Oregon
Portland Historic Landmarks